Dungannon Upper is a barony  in County Tyrone, Northern Ireland. It was created in 1851 with the splitting of the barony of Dungannon. Lough Neagh runs along its eastern boundary, and it is bordered by four other baronies: Dungannon Middle to the south; Loughinsholin to the north; Strabane Upper to the north-west; and Omagh East to the south-west.

List of main settlements
 Ardboe
 Coagh
 Cookstown
 Tullyhogue

List of civil parishes
Below is a list of civil parishes in Dungannon Upper:
Arboe (split with barony of Loughinsholin)
Artrea (split with barony of Loughinsholin)
Ballinderry (split with barony of Loughinsholin)
Ballyclog
Derryloran (split with barony of Loughinsholin)
Desertcreat
Kildress
Lissan (also partly in barony of Loughinsholin)
Tamlaght (split with barony of Loughinsholin)

References

 
1851 establishments in Ireland